International Renewable Energy Conference is a meeting of senior-level representatives from the Executive and Legislative branches of government at the national and subnational level, international organizations, the finance and business community, and civil society who are working to advance the integration of renewable energy in their countries.

History 
Initiated at the Renewables 2004 conference in Bonn, IREC is a high-level political conference series dedicated to renewable energy policy worldwide. Dedicated exclusively to the renewable energy sector, IRECs are hosted by alternate Governments every two years and convened by REN21.
One of the major accomplishments of the 2002 World Summit on Sustainable Development (WSSD) in Johannesburg, South Africa, was the recognition that renewable energy is a critical component of sustainable development, energy security, climate change, and air quality.

Worldwide enthusiasm for renewable energy has increased dramatically since WSSD.

Bonn 
The Bonn Renewable Energy Conference in 2004 was the inaugural, government-hosted international conference on renewable energy. 154 countries attended the Bonn Conference, which produced 3 outcomes: 
 A Political Declaration containing shared political goals for an increased role of renewable energies and reflecting a joint vision of a sustainable energy future that provides better and more equitable access to energy as well as increased energy efficiency. 
 An International Action Program of voluntary commitments to goals, targets, and actions within their own spheres of responsibility from governments, international organizations, and other stakeholders.
 Policy Recommendations for Renewable Energies that can be of benefit to governments, international organizations, and stakeholders as they develop new approaches and political strategies and address the roles and responsibilities of key actors.

Beijing 

The 2005 conference was held at the Great Hall of the People in Beijing from 7–8 November 2005. The conference called the world to consider renewable energy alternatives in a time of high oil prices.

Washington 

The Washington International Renewable Energy Conference (WIREC 2008) was held March 4–6, 2008.

New Delhi 

The Delhi International Renewable Energy Conference (DIREC 2010) was held 27–29 October 2010, in New Delhi, India.

Abu Dhabi 
The Abu Dhabi Renewable Energy Conference (ADIREC) was held in Abu Dhabi in January 2013. In a declaration, participants called for the world's shares of renewable energy to double by 2030 under the leadership of the International Renewable Energy Agency(IRENA).

South Africa 

In October 2015, South Africa became the sixth country, and the first in Africa, to host
the International Renewable Energy Conference (IREC). The South African
International Renewable Energy Conference – SAIREC 2015 – provided a global
platform for government ministers, high-level decision makers, experts, specialists and
thought leaders, as well as private sector players and civil society, to discuss and
exchange their vision, experiences and solutions to accelerate the global scale-up of
renewable energy.

From 4–7 October South Africa welcomed 3,600 delegates from more than 80 countries.
This international event comprised 24 conference sessions featuring more than 150
speakers, 41 side events, 35 technical site visits and 56 exhibitors, providing extensive
opportunities for delegates to discuss, learn and network.
SAIREC provided a platform to address energy security and access. Under the theme
of RE-Energising Africa, SAIREC demonstrated why Africa is the business destination
for the renewables energy sector. It also provided Africa with a unique opportunity to
showcase its nascent yet promising renewable energy industry and gain experience
from best practices as adopted in countries at the forefront of renewable energy
deployment.
In parallel REN21 launched the SADC Renewable Energy and Energy Efficiency Status
Report, which provides a comprehensive overview of the status of renewable energy
and energy efficiency in the region. It covers the 15 SADC countries: Angola,
Botswana, the Democratic Republic of Congo (DRC), Lesotho, Madagascar, Malawi,
Mauritius, Mozambique, Namibia, Seychelles, South Africa, Swaziland, United Republic
of Tanzania, Zambia and Zimbabwe. The report is available for download on the REN21
website along with a series of infographics.
SAIREC was co-hosted by South Africa’s Department of Energy together with the South
African National Energy Development Institute (SANEDI), under the leadership of the
Minister of Energy, Honorable Ms Tina Joemat-Pettersson (MP), with REN21 and with
the final support of the German Federal Ministry for Economic Cooperation and
Development, GIZ. See the REN21 website for the conference report, full Declaration
text, and photos

Mexico City 

The renewable energy community came together in Mexico City mid-September under
the banner of the International Renewable Energy Conference (IREC). The Mexico

International Renewable Energy Conference (MEXIREC) was the 7th in this conference
series, continuing the tradition of convening government and non-state actors around
the development of renewable energy policy.

MEXIREC’s agenda was designed to encourage a systems approach to energy where
the generation and use of renewable energy are analysed from an integrated and
multifaceted perspective. The conference demonstrated how this diversification is
occurring, not only in Latin American and the Caribbean but elsewhere in the world.

Over the course of two days, more than 1,600 delegates participated in talks and
presentations that revolved around five thematic areas: Policy and Finance; Electricity
Sector and Infrastructure; Heating and Cooling/Transport; Energy Access/Local Value
Creation; and Technology Innovations. The presence and active participation of young
professionals and women was particularly encouraging. It ended with presentation and
acceptance of the Conference Declaration.

In parallel a new report, Renewable Energy Tenders and Community [Em]power[ment]:
Latin America and the Caribbean was launched. The bi-lingual report (English/Spanish)
examines both the rise of tendering and community power projects in the region and proposes an accession process to reconcile the tension between maximising economic
returns and social impact.

MEXIREC was the leading event of the “Dialogues for the Future of Energy, Mexico
2017” (DEMEX). It was held 11–13 September 2017 at the Expo Santa Fe Convention
Center, Mexico City and co-organized by SENER and REN21 will the support of the
German government. See the REN21 website for the conference report, full Declaration
text, photos and much more.

South Korea 

IREC 2019 will be held in South Korea. Korea’s ambition to
phase out nuclear and coal and to increase levels of renewable energy in its national
energy mix were key determining factors in its selection. The conference is scheduled
for 23–26 October 2019 in Seoul.

Madrid 
IREC 2023 will be held in Madrid. Spain's ambition to become a clean and renewable country has peaked the interest of the IREC. 

Official side events

Official Side Events are a forum for non-governmental, governmental, and/or inter-governmental partners to showcase their projects/programs in front of a high level public and private sector audience.

See also 
International Renewable Energy Agency
Lists about renewable energy

References 

This article also incorporates material from https://www.ren21.net/events/irecs/.

Further reading
Clean Tech Nation: How the U.S. Can Lead in the New Global Economy (2012) by Ron Pernick and Clint Wilder
Deploying Renewables 2011 (2011) by the International Energy Agency
Reinventing Fire: Bold Business Solutions for the New Energy Era (2011) by Amory Lovins
Renewable Energy Sources and Climate Change Mitigation (2011) by the IPCC
Solar Energy Perspectives (2011) by the International Energy Agency

External links 
 President Bush Attends Washington International Renewable Energy Conference 2008.
 https://web.archive.org/web/20080820093016/http://www.wirec2008.gov/
 www.direc2010.gov.in
 Official DIREC Blog hosted by reegle
 http://www.sairec.org.za/

International renewable energy organizations